Cruoricaptor is a Gram-negative genus of bacteria from the family of Weeksellaceae with one known species (Cruoricaptor ignavus).

References

Flavobacteria
Monotypic bacteria genera
Bacteria genera